The men's long jump at the 2022 Commonwealth Games, as part of the athletics programme, took place in the Alexander Stadium on 2 and 4 August 2022.

Records
Prior to this competition, the existing world and Games records were as follows:

Schedule
The schedule was as follows:

All times are British Summer Time (UTC+1)

Results

Qualifying round
Across two groups, those who jumped ≥8.00 m (Q) or at least the 12 best performers (q) advanced to the final.

Final
The medals were determined in the final.

References

Men's long jump
2022